Pococí is a canton in the Limón province of Costa Rica. The head city is in Guápiles district, which houses many of the canton's services and businesses.

History 
Pococí was created on 19 September 1911 by decree 12.

Geography 
Pococí has an area of  km2 and a mean elevation of  metres.

The canton takes in the Caribbean coast from the Toro River northward to the border with Nicaragua. It ranges inland in a southwestern direction with the Chirripó River forming the western border. The canton ends in the Cordillera Central where the Sucio River crosses the National Route 32 in Braulio Carrillo National Park.

Districts 
The canton of Pococí is subdivided into the following districts:
 Guápiles
 Jiménez
 La Rita
 Roxana
 Cariari
 Colorado
 La Colonia

Demographics 

For the 2011 census, Pococí had a population of  inhabitants.

Transportation

Road transportation 
The canton is covered by the following road routes:

Tourism
The Caribbean coast of Pococí boasts extensive wetlands and several protected areas, including Tortuguero National Park and Barra del Colorado Wildlife Refuge.  In the Braulio Carrillo area is located the first aerial tram in the world to travel through a rainforest, called Rainforest Adventures and recently added to NatGeographic's top ten adventure trips. Much of the northern portion of the canton is inundated year-round or seasonally, and inaccessible by road.  The wetlands stretch inland the length of the canton. The coastal areas provide important sea turtle nesting habitat. These protected areas and wetlands are an important eco-tourism destination.

References 

Cantons of Limón Province
Populated places in Limón Province